Adventist University of Haiti called in French:Université Adventiste d'Haïti is situated some five miles (8 km) southwest of Port-au-Prince, in the Carrefour  neighborhood.

It is a part of the Seventh-day Adventist education system, the world's second largest Christian school system.

History
First established in 1921 as Séminaire Adventiste d'Haïti, near Cap-Haïtien, the school was moved to Port-au-Prince in 1933. It was authorized to offer complete secondary work by the Ministry of Education in 1935. In 1946 the seminary was moved to its present site. Authorized to offer the Baccalaureate degree by the Ministry of Education in 1959, in 1964 it was granted General Conference authorization to offer two-year postsecondary work. The degree of Bachelor of Theology (license) was authorized by the General Conference in 1973. Currently, the institution offers degree programs in other areas also.

The school offers degrees in business administration, education, and theology. It also offers diploma programs in secretarial science, music, modern languages, and other areas.

See also

 List of Seventh-day Adventist colleges and universities
 Seventh-day Adventist education

References

Educational institutions established in 1921
Universities and colleges affiliated with the Seventh-day Adventist Church
Universities in Haiti
1921 establishments in Haiti